"Two Doors Down" is a song written and performed by Dolly Parton, which was a 1978 U.S. country and pop hit for her. The song is sung from the perspective of a woman who has just broken up with her boyfriend and is debating attending a party two doors down the hall from her apartment.  She decides to go, meets a new man, and returns with him to her own apartment "two doors down".

It was included on Parton's 1977 Here You Come Again album. However, before Parton could release it as the album's second single in February 1978, singer Zella Lehr released a cover version that became a top ten U.S. country hit. While Lehr's version was on the country charts, the title cut of Here You Come Again was becoming a much bigger pop hit than Parton had anticipated. Wanting to capitalize on her newfound pop success (and also not wanting to compete with Lehr's country version of the song) Parton rerecorded a more loose, pop-oriented version of "Two Doors Down" with a slight disco flavoring. She released the new version on a double-A-sided single, with the other side, "It's All Wrong, but It's All Right" intended for country airplay, and "Two Doors Down" intended for the pop airplay. The single topped the U.S. country charts, and was a top-20 pop hit for Parton, and went on to become one of her most popular hits. Also in 1978 Joe Thomas did his own disco cover of this song.

Parton also had the new version of "Two Doors Down" (which omitted the first verse, and included an upbeat "sing-along" bridge) replace the previous version on all subsequent pressings of Here You Come Again, making the earlier version something of a collectors' item among Parton's fans. The original version of "Two Doors Down" was subsequently issued on CD in 2000 on the 3-CD Australian compilation Legendary Dolly Parton.

Chart performance

Dolly Parton

Zella Lehr

Year-end charts

References

Dolly Parton songs
Jill Johnson songs
Zella Lehr songs
Songs written by Dolly Parton
RCA Records singles
1977 songs
Song recordings produced by Gary Klein (producer)